A mukbang or meokbang, also known as an eating show, is an online audiovisual broadcast in which a host consumes various quantities of food while interacting with the audience. It became popular in South Korea in 2010, and has then since become a major contributor to Hallyu, along with the export of K-Beauty, K-pop, and Korean dramas, earning and cementing its status as a global trend since the mid-2010s. Varieties of foods ranging from pizza to noodles are consumed in front of a camera. The purpose of mukbang is also sometimes educational, introducing viewers to regional specialities or gourmet spots.

A mukbang is usually prerecorded or streamed live through a webcast on streaming platforms such as AfreecaTV, YouTube, TikTok, and Twitch. In the live version, the mukbang host chats with the audience while the audience type in real-time in the live chat room. Eating shows are expanding their influence on internet broadcasting platforms and serve as a virtual community and a venue for active communication among internet users.

Mukbangers in East Asia and North America have gained considerable popularity on numerous social media platforms and have spearheaded the mukbang as a possible viable alternative career path with a potential to earn a high income for young South Koreans. By cooking and consuming food on camera for a large audience, mukbangers generate income from advertising, sponsorships, endorsements, as well as viewers' support. However, there has been growing criticism of mukbang's promotion of unhealthy eating habits, animal cruelty, and food waste.

Etymology
The word mukbang is a portmanteau of the Korean words for "eating" and "broadcast/show". It would thus be morphologically comparable to "eatcast/eatshow".

Historical background
Korea has traditionally had a food culture based on healthy eating practices and strict etiquette. However, a new food culture has emerged in Korea characterized by internet eating culture (mukbang). First introduced on the real-time internet TV service AfreecaTV in 2009, it now has become a trend in cable channels as well as terrestrial broadcasting. This form of programming emphasizes the attractiveness of the person who prepares the food. Eating and cooking shows are becoming effective programs for broadcasting companies as production costs are lower than reality entertainment programs.

In each broadcast, a host will interact with their viewers through online chat rooms. Many hosts generate revenue through mukbang by accepting donations or partnering with advertising networks. The popularity of mukbang streams has spread outside of Korea, with online streamers doing their own mukbang streams in other countries. In 2016, Twitch introduced new categories like "social eating" to spotlight them.

An article in contended that the popularity of eating shows can be attributed in part to the widespread anxiety and unhappiness in Koreans due to their country's long-term economic slump. Articles about mukbang have also appeared in The Huffington Post and The Wall Street Journal. The Korean word for eating show, "mukbang," has been widely adopted in other types of eating shows, such as those featuring ASMR on platforms such as YouTube.

This eating performance from South Korea has also rapidly spread in influence and popularity to other Asian countries such as Japan and China. In China, mukbang is called "Chibo"; hosts make their content into short videos and vlogs and upload them onto social media platforms like Weibo.

Culture
Mukbang (먹방) emerged from a solo-eating population in South Korea, that found entertainment in watching actors and actresses eating in TV shows and movies. The contrast to the traditional eating culture that revolves around eating from the same communal dishes at the family dinner table has been acknowledged.

It has been suggested one can vicariously satisfy the desire for food by viewing. In Korea, individuals who stream mukbang are called broadcast jockeys (BJs). As a result, high level of interaction BJ-to-viewer and viewer-to-viewer contributes to the sociability aspect of producing and consuming mukbang content. For example, during broadcast jockey, Changhyun's interaction with his audience he temporarily paused to follow a fan's directions on what to eat next and how to eat it. Viewers may influence the direction of the stream but the BJ retains control over what he or she eats. Ventriloquism, by which BJs mime the actions of their fans by directing food to the camera in a feeding motion and eating in their stead, is another technique that creates the illusion of a shared experience in one room.

A study conducted by Seoul National University found that within a two-year time frame (April 2017 to April 2019) the term "mukbang" was used in over 100,000 videos from YouTube. It reported that alleviating the feelings of loneliness associated with eating alone may be the primary reason for mukbang's popularity. In a pilot study from February 2022 on mukbang-watching and mental health, psychologists lay the foundation for future investigation into the potential detriments of using mukbang, or virtual eating, as a substitute for social experiences. Another reason for mukbang viewing could be its potential sexual appeal. Researchers have argued that mukbangs can be viewed to satisfy eating-related fetishes, and have commented on the sexualized gaze brought about by watching hosts in such a private and intimate state. Mukbang has also been described as a multi-sensory experience and compared to a similar carnal video type, pornography. It has been proposed that strict regulation on pornography and sexual material in Korea could be a contributing factor to the popularity of mukbang. Researchers liken the reduced satisfaction of eating from fervid viewership of mukbang to the diminished satisfaction of sex from overconsumption of pornography. Other studies argue that individuals who watch mukbang do so for entertainment, as an escape from reality, or to get satisfaction from the ASMR aspects of mukbang such as the eating sounds and sensations.

Varieties
A popular sub-genre of the trend is "cook-bang" (쿡방) show, in which the streamer includes the preparation and cooking of the dishes featured as part of the show.

South Korean video game players have sometimes broadcast mukbang as breaks during their overall streams. The popularity of this practice among local users led the video game streaming service Twitch to begin trialing a dedicated "social eating" category in July 2016; a representative of the service stated that this category is not necessarily specific to mukbang, but would leave the concept open to interpretation by streamers within its guidelines.

Media platforms

AfreecaTV

The typical eating show broadcast jockeys (BJ) on AfreecaTV are Bumfrica, Shuki, Mbro, Changhyun, Wangju, etc.

Twitch

Twitch added a new "social eating" item to its channel list in July 2016. Famous streamers include ImAllexx, Ameliabrador, and Simple Life on Air.

YouTube
Many people are famous for making these type of videos on YouTube, including ip zalboon hetnim, Hamzy, Nado, and heebab. There are numerous others, including users who make videos of themselves eating in their daily lives.

Content creators in Asia

Mukbang broadcasts typically feature a solo eater (or with friends) who would usually eat in large portions along with a few other dishes. Most of these creators would cook their own food and show it in their content. Although traditional Korean food is the main food for these videos, fast food or junk food has also been popularly trending.

Banzz
At one time, Banzz had 3.08 million YouTube subscribers and held the number one spot among the mukbang streamers. In March 2020, his channel was at just over 2.5 million subscribers. Banzz is a typical example of mukbang. Banzz had been featured on AfreecaTV, including the 2016 Afreeca Grand Prix, but turned to YouTube as his platform after controversies at AfreecaTV. He was assessed a penalty for breaking contracts with AfreecaTV and appeared on JTBC's program Lanseon Life. He is noted for eating extreme amounts of food during mukbangs, and nevertheless maintains a muscular figure in the videos, saying he exercises an average of eight hours a day for health. His mukbang show includes Hongdae monster Jajangmyeon, fast-eating of 10 hamburgers, and Jajangmyeon mukbang.

Mbro
Mbro, short for Monster Brothers, is a mukbang BJ on AfreecaTV and YouTube. Mbro started broadcasting in April 2015. Mbro has over 900,000 YouTube subscribers, ranking second in the BJ popularity ranking in AfreecaTV a year after it started broadcasting, and emerging as a star of the mukbang industry with the AfreecaTV newcomer award.

Shugi
Shugi broadcasts most nights of the week. Her trademark is rapidly eating up to four spicy rice cakes in a single mouthful. Shugi's mukbang show is also famous for its sensory performance. She is good at using her lively facial expression and describing the food and her feelings. Her way of doing mukbang easily caused the consensus from the viewers. For example, she once described the sound of grilling meat to resemble the sound of rain, which made the video more engaging to the audience. Also, the fact that her video background is clean and light is only given to her and the food makes the audience focus only on her mukbang and won't be distracted by the background. She started broadcasting in May 2014 and won the AfreecaTV BJ Festival Rookie of the Year award. Since then, she has won all of the BJ's awards from 2015 to 2017 and is currently second place in the rankings of AfreecaTV's eating shows.

DKD
DKD, consisting of the brothers DK and KD, is a channel with 2.89 million subscribers on YouTube. It is especially famous for ASMR broadcasting "real sound". In general, the food is done by BJ eating food while chatting with viewers in real-time. But the real sound is said to be a good thing to eat in a short video of about 20 minutes, especially when food is eaten. It is also famous for eating foods that are not common at tables such as sugarcane, aloe, and honey as well as Korean general foods such as chicken, tteokbokki.

Yuka Kinoshita
Yuka Kinoshita is a YouTuber who works in Japan with 5.15 million subscribers. Known as a "big eater" or "oogui" (Japanese: 大食い, おおぐい), she uploads daily mukbang videos where she consumes large portions of food. She made her debut in the 2009 Japan Eating Contest, and since 2014 she has started her own mukbang videos on her YouTube channel. In one of her videos, Yuka ate 137 Philippine bananas and caused controversy among Chinese viewers. Many Chinese netizens accused her of assaulting China using that 137 bananas because there are 1.37 billion people in China and this episode was posted soon after the South China Sea Ruling. However, there are also Chinese netizens that don't see this as a problem.

Though YouTube is not available in mainland China, Yuka still has lots of Chinese fans since she established her own Weibo account where she has 2.66 million followers and 130,000 viewers when live streaming.

Western versions
Several American YouTubers have become popular with their own version of mukbang. The concept is similar to the one of eastern versions, with an online audiovisual broadcast in which a host eats large amounts of food. However, in most western versions, hosts do not do their mukbangs live like Korean mukbangers and instead resort to pre-recorded and edited videos posted on platforms like YouTube. Often, the amounts of food eaten are also larger than most of their Asian counterparts. In addition, a lot of western hosts focus on the ASMR aspects of a mukbang broadcast. Finally, western mukbangs also usually involve the host describing the food they eat and talking through their meal; this is not very common in live eastern mukbangs.

Content creators in North America

Keemi 
Keemi is an American mukbanger on YouTube who, as of June 2022, has garnered 895 thousand subscribers on her channel. Her channel features cooking and eating videos. Known for cooking in her college dorm and her Chicago apartment, Keemi's content also includes ASMR and food-vlog style videos.

Stephanie Soo 
Stephanie Soo is an American mukbanger and a YouTuber who includes conspiracy theories and crime stories in her mukbang videos. Soo's channel had 2.45 million subscribers in April 2021.

Nikocado Avocado 

Nikocado Avocado (real name Nicolas Perry) is an American mukbanger who, as of December 2022 has garnered over 3.4 million subscribers on his (main) YouTube channel. Perry began his YouTube channel in 2014 as a vegan vlogger, but gave up veganism, citing health issues. He has gained wide spread attention for consuming excessive amounts of food, as well as frequent emotional outbursts in his videos. His on-camera behavior has led to Perry being involved in multiple controversies, as well as leaving many of his viewers expressing their concerns over Perry's mental health. According to Perry's interview with MEL Magazine, his online conflicts are self-orchestrated for the benefit of his career, citing his past education in performance arts and his desire to play the role of the villain.

Bethany Gaskin 
Bethany Gaskin has multiple YouTube channels and has amassed a following of over 3 million subscribers on the platform. Gaskin specializes in seafood mukbangs. Like other Western mukbangs, many of Gaskin's videos focus on the ASMR aspect of eating food online with viewers watching her videos to relax and receive "brain tingles". Gaskin is one of the highest-grossing Western mukbangers making money through sponsorships, as well as from the sales of her own secret "Smackalicious" sauce.

Veronica Wang 
Veronica Wang is a Canadian mukbanger with 1.78 million followers on YouTube. Characterized as always having make-up on, she cooks and eats different types of food around the world on camera, ranging from Ethiopian injera, Korean fried cheese balls, to Italian spaghetti bolognese.

Monetization 
Mukbangers incurring income from such videos can earn from advertising. This performance of eating can allow top broadcasters to earn as much as $10,000 a month which does not include sponsorships. Live-streaming platforms like AfreecaTV and Twitch allow viewers to send payments to their favorite streamers.

Creators can also earn income through endorsements, e-books, and product reviews. Bethany Gaskin, under the name Bloveslife for her channel, has made over $1 million from advertising on her videos as reported by The New York Times.

Soo Tang, also known as MommyTang on YouTube, is a mukbanger with 490,000 subscribers on her channel. In an interview with Today Food, Tang claimed that successful mukbangers can earn about $100,000 in a year.

Criticism

Promotion of unhealthy eating habits
The volume of food and the manner of its consumption in mukbang has been criticized for normalizing and glorifying gluttony or overeating.

In July 2018, the South Korean government announced that it would create and regulate mukbang guidelines by launching the "National Obesity Management Comprehensive Measures". The Ministry of Health and Welfare announced the measures, which were intended to address binge eating and harm to the public health caused by mukbang. Criticisms were levied against the ministry: the Blue House petition board received about 40 petitions against mukbang regulations, which maintained arguments such as "there is no correlation between mukbang and binge eating" and "the government is infringing on individual freedom."

A study, which investigated the popularity of mukbang and its health impacts on the public, analyzed media coverage, articles, and YouTube video content related to "mukbang" and concluded that people who frequently watch mukbang may be more susceptible to adopting poor eating habits. In a survey involving 380 non-nutrition majors at a university in Gyeonggi Province, and their tendencies to watch mukbang and its close variant, cookbang, a significant 29.1% of frequent mukbang-watchers self-diagnosed negative habits, such as increased intake of processed and delivered foods or eating out. Mukbang has also been credited as a dietary restriction device for curbing food cravings and excessive watching may be correlated with the exacerbation or relapse of eating disorders. A netnographic analysis of popular mukbang videos on YouTube revealed a significant number of viewer comments expressing fascination with the ability to remain thin after ingesting large amounts of unhealthy foods, and a major subcategory of which attempted to explain this phenomenon by naming medical mysteries, sourcing Asian ethnicity, as well as providing anecdotal evidence. BJs' experiences with fat shaming and their underweight counterparts' with speculation for purging and engaging in other unhealthy eating habits off-camera were also noted.

In 2019, mukbanger Nicholas Perry, known as Nikocado Avocado, shared that the amount of binge eating from mukbang has taken a toll on his health, leading to issues such as erectile dysfunction, frequent diarrhea, sleep apnea, mobility problems and gaining weight.

In August 2021, Italian mukbanger Omar Palermo, also known as YouTubo Anche Io, died from a heart attack.

Food wastage 
Excessive amounts of food are consumed and wasted during mukbang.

Some mukbangers chew food and then spit it out, but edit their videos to remove the spitting, so as to create the false impression that a large volume of food has been consumed. A YouTube mukbanger called Moon Bok Hee was criticized for this practice.

In 2020, General Secretary of the Chinese Communist Party Xi Jinping launched the 'Clean Plate' campaign, calling on the nation to guard against food waste. This campaign prompted state-run media outlets such as CCTV to run reports critical of mukbangers. Users on several Chinese apps received warnings about their mukbang contents and faced an influx of negative comments. Later, Douyin promised to have stricter verification on food-related videos. Other media platforms, including Bilibili and Kuaishou, have encouraged not wasting food.

Incidents of animal cruelty

Ssoyoung, a popular mukbang streamer, has received attention and much criticism for inflicting cruelty to living sea creatures before and during their consumption in her mukbang videos. Examples of live animals subjected to prolonged bodily harm while alive include fish, sharks, crabs, squid, and octopuses, and include an incident where Ssoyoung poured table salt onto a basin of live eels, and an incident where squids had their mantles cut off, but were kept alive before having soy sauce poured over their exposed nerves, inflicting excessive pain and suffering to the animals. Korean viewers also criticized Ssoyoung for claiming that some of her "exotic" meals were normal in Korean cuisine and culture.

Health impact 
As the food consumption of influencers adversely affect the food consumption of viewers, watching Mukbang videos leave their viewers at a risk of being unhealthy or affect their health significantly badly.

A study in 2021 which addressed the problem of Mukbang and the effect of food consumption of influencers on their viewers' shows that affected individuals are susceptible to disorders such as anorexia nervosa, bulimia nervosa, and binge eating disorder.

A sulbang (Korean:술방, pronounced [sulpaŋ]) or eating show with alcohol videos can be watched by anyone including minors, which may inadvertently stimulate alcohol consumption among teenagers.

Watching Mukbang videos often create intimacy between the mukbanger and the viewer, and it could increase the likelihood of solo-dining of viewers.

See also
 Cooking show
 Food competition
 Food porn

References

External links
 

Articles containing video clips
Eating behaviors
Entertainment in South Korea
Food and drink television
Food and drink in South Korea
Streaming television